Ksenia Solo (born 8 October 1987; pronounced ) is a Latvian-Canadian actress known for portraying Mackenzie "Kenzi" Malikov on Lost Girl. She portrayed Peggy Shippen on Turn: Washington's Spies. Solo also portrayed the character "Natasha" in the 2010 American television series Life Unexpected and Shay Davydov in Season 3 of Orphan Black. , her most recent work was in the main cast for the two seasons of the series Project Blue Book (2019–20).

Early life 
Solo was born in Riga in the Latvian SSR, and is of Russian heritage. At the age of five, she moved with her family to Toronto, where she was raised. She studied ballet until the age of 14, when a back injury forced her to stop; her mother is a former ballerina-turned-actress.

Career 
Solo played Zoey Jones on the APTN series renegadepress.com. In both 2005 and 2006, she won the Gemini Award for Best Performance in a Children's or Youth Program or Series for her work on the show.  She went on to appear in other Canadian television series and movies, such as the films Love Thy Neighbor and Mayday, as well as guest-starring on the television series Kojak.

In 2010, Solo played a small role in Darren Aronofsky's Black Swan starring Natalie Portman and Mila Kunis. From 2010 to 2011 she played Natasha Siviac in the CW series Life Unexpected. From 2010 to 2015, she starred as Kenzi in the Showcase series Lost Girl; Solo's heritage and fluency in the Russian language were written into the role. She was cast as Dodge in the pilot episode of Locke & Key, but the series was not picked up by Fox. In 2013, Solo began filming the independent film Another You on location in Charleston, West Virginia.

In 2015, Solo joined the main cast of Turn: Washington's Spies as Peggy Shippen. She also had a recurring role in Season 3 of Orphan Black as Shay.

Solo is actively involved with the anti-bullying foundation Stand for the Silent, and was made one of their directors.

Filmography

Film

Television

References

External links

 
 
 

1987 births
Living people
21st-century Canadian actresses
Canadian ballerinas
Canadian child actresses
Canadian female dancers
Canadian film actresses
Canadian television actresses
Best Supporting Actress in a Drama Series Canadian Screen Award winners
Latvian emigrants to Canada
Russian emigrants to Canada
Actors from Riga
Canadian people of Russian descent
Latvian people of Russian descent